Miss USA 1997 was the 46th Miss USA pageant, held at Shreveport, Louisiana in January and February, 1997.   Delegates arrived in the city on January 19, the preliminary competition was held on February 2, 1997 and the final competition on February 5, 1997. The event, held at the Hirsch Memorial Coliseum was broadcast live on CBS.

At the conclusion of the final competition, Brook Lee of Hawaii was crowned by outgoing titleholder Ali Landry of Louisiana, becoming the fourth Hawaiian to win the Miss USA pageant and the first win in 19 years, since Judi Andersen in Miss USA 1978. After Lee won the Miss Universe 1997 title three months later, first runner-Up Brandi Sherwood of Idaho immediately inherited the Miss USA title on the night of the latter competition. Sherwood became the first Miss Teen USA winner (Miss Teen USA 1989) and the third Miss Teen USA state delegate in a row to hold the Miss USA title. Upon Sherwood inheriting the Miss USA 1997 title, she also became the first Idaho delegate to hold the Miss USA title.

The pageant was held in Shreveport, Louisiana for the first time, having been held in South Padre Island, Texas the previous three years and in Wichita, Kansas the four years prior.  The new location was announced in August 1996, and then reigning Miss USA, Louisiana native Ali Landry, was invited to attend the official contract signing.

The pageant was hosted by George Hamilton for the only time, and Marla Maples Trump, soon-to-be ex-wife of pageant owner Donald Trump, offered colour commentary for the only time. Randy Newman provided entertainment during the competition.

Just prior to the final event it was announced that broadcaster CBS had entered a partnership with Trump, becoming half-owners of the Miss USA pageant and the associated Miss Teen USA and Miss Universe competitions.

While the delegates were in Louisiana, over sixty corporate sponsors provided funding for events, which included dinners, receptions and cocktail parties.  There were over three hundred volunteers involved.  The delegates were involved in more than forty-five hours of rehearsals prior to the preliminary competition and final show.

This was the first year in which delegates were allowed to choose whether they wanted to wear one-piece or two-piece bathing suits for the preliminary and final swimsuit competitions. In previous years, the delegates were all assigned to only wear either one or the other.

Results

Placements

∞ Lee won Miss Universe 1997. Due to protocol, Lee resigns her title as Miss USA 1997. 1st runner-up, Brandi Sherwood, replaces her as Miss USA.

Special awards
Miss Congeniality - Napiera Groves (District of Columbia)
Miss Photogenic - Audra Wilks (Virginia)
Best in Swimsuit - Angelia Savage (Florida)

Historical significance 
 Hawaii wins competition for the fourth time.
 Idaho earns the 1st runner-up position for the first time and surpasses its previous highest placement in 1964. Also it became the 25th state who wins the Miss USA title for the first time. She finished as 1st runner-up, but succeeded as Miss USA 1997 after Brook Lee became Miss Universe.
 Tennessee earns the 2nd runner-up position for the fourth time and repeats the same position as the last year 1996.
 Florida finishes as Top 6 for the second time. The last time it placed this was in 1995.
 Texas finishes as Top 6 for the second time. The last time it placed this was in 1994. Also it reached its highest placement since Chelsi Smith won in 1995. Ironically, Smith went on to win the Miss Universe title in 1995.
 Utah finishes as Top 6 for the first time and reaches its highest placement since 1982.
 States that placed in semifinals the previous year were Oklahoma, Tennessee, Texas and Utah.
 Texas placed for the sixth consecutive year.
 Oklahoma placed for the third consecutive year. 
 Tennessee and Utah made their second consecutive placement. 
 Florida and Rhode Island last placed in 1995.
 Hawaii last placed in 1994.
 New Jersey last placed in 1993.
 Alabama last placed in 1992.
 Idaho last placed in 1964.
 Illinois and Louisiana break an ongoing streak of placements since 1994.

Scores

Preliminary competition
The following are the contestants' scores in the preliminary competition.

 Winner
 First runner-up
 Second runner-up 
 Top 6 Finalist 
 Top 10 Semifinalist

Final competition

 Winner
 First runner-up
 Second runner-up 
 Top 6 Finalist

Delegates
The Miss USA 1997 delegates were:

 Alabama – Autumn Smith
 Alaska – Rea Bavilla
 Arizona – Jessica Shahriari
 Arkansas – Tamara Henry
 California – Alisa Kimble
 Colorado – Damien Muñoz
 Connecticut – Christine Pavone
 Delaware – Patricia Gauani
 District of Columbia – Napiera Groves
 Florida – Angelia Savage
 Georgia – Denesha Reid
 Hawaii – Brook Lee
 Idaho – Brandi Sherwood
 Illinois – Jennifer Celenas
 Indiana – Tricia Nosko
 Iowa – Shawn Marie Brogan
 Kansas – Kathryn Taylor
 Kentucky – Rachyl Hoskins
 Louisiana – Nikole Viola
 Maine – Stephanie Worcester
 Maryland – Ann Coale
 Massachusetts – Jennifer Chapman
 Michigan – Jennifer Reed
 Minnesota – Melissa Hall
 Mississippi – Arleen McDonald
 Missouri – Amanda Jahn
 Montana – Christin Didier
 Nebraska – Kim Weir
 Nevada – Ninya Perna
 New Hampshire – Gretchen Durgin
 New Jersey – Jennifer Makris
 New Mexico – Tanya Harris
 New York – Ramona Reuter
 North Carolina – Crystal McLaurin-Coney
 North Dakota – Lauri Marie Gapp
 Ohio – Michelle Mouser
 Oklahoma – Trisha Stillwell
 Oregon – Heather Williams
 Pennsylvania – Cara Bernosky
 Rhode Island – Claudia Jordan
 South Carolina – Casey Mizell
 South Dakota – Jamie Swenson
 Tennessee – Towanna Stone
 Texas – Amanda Little
 Utah – Temple Taggart
 Vermont – Lisa Constantino
 Virginia – Audra Wilks
 Washington – Sara Nicole Williams
 West Virginia – Natalie Bevins
 Wisconsin – Tara Marie Johnson
 Wyoming – Stacy Dawn Cenedese

Crossovers
Ten delegates had previously competed in either the Miss Teen USA or Miss America pageants.

Delegates who had previously held a Miss Teen USA state title were:
Brandi Sherwood (Idaho) - Miss Idaho Teen USA 1989 and Miss Teen USA 1989
Claudia Jordan (Rhode Island) - Miss Rhode Island Teen USA 1990
Autumn Smith (Alabama) - Miss Alabama Teen USA 1993
Audra Wilks (Virginia) - Miss Virginia Teen USA 1988
Michelle Mouser (Ohio) - Miss Ohio Teen USA 1991
Arlene McDonald (Mississippi) - Miss Mississippi Teen USA 1992 (Top 12 Semi-Finalist at Miss Teen USA 1992)
Danesha Reed (Georgia) - Miss Georgia Teen USA 1993 (Top 6 Finalist at Miss Teen USA 1993)
Gretchen Jurgin (New Hampshire) - Miss New Hampshire Teen USA 1993

Delegates who had previously held a Miss America state title were:
Jennifer Makris (New Jersey) - Miss New Jersey 1994 (Second runner-up at Miss America 1995)
Stacy Dawn Cenedese (Wyoming) - Miss Wyoming 1992
Tamara Henry  (Arkansas) competed on RuPaul's Drag U Season 3 "Ex Beauty Queens" and Won.

Judges
Michael Andretti
Ingrid Casares
Gayle Gurchiek
Nick Lowery
Frédéric Fekkai
Madison
Philip G. Satre
Cary-Hiroyuki Tagawa

See also
Miss Universe 1997
Miss Teen USA 1997

References

External links
Miss USA official website

THE HEAVY BURDEN OF MISS USA

1997
February 1997 events in the United States
1997 beauty pageants
1997 in Louisiana